Holly Mae Muller (born 26 August 1997) is an English singer and songwriter. She first received mainstream recognition after releasing the single "Better Days" in 2021, a collaboration with Swedish music collective Neiked and American rapper Polo G, which went on to chart in the top 40 in both the United Kingdom and United States. She will represent the United Kingdom in the Eurovision Song Contest 2023 on homesoil in Liverpool, with the song "I Wrote a Song", which became the first UK Eurovision entry in over a decade to debut on the UK Singles Chart's top 40.

Early life 
Muller was raised in a Jewish family in Kentish Town, London to parents Matt Muller and Nicola Jackson who separated when she was six. She has an older full-brother, Sam, and three younger brothers from her parents' subsequent relationships. Her grandfather is a child Holocaust survivor who managed to escape to Britain from Germany at age 12, and later moved to Wales.

Muller began writing her own music at the age of eight. Although her parents sought boarding at Kimbolton School in Cambridgeshire, she eventually attended Fine Arts College in Belsize Park, north London. In 2007, as a child, Muller appeared in the music video for "Grace Kelly" by Mika.

Career
While working at American Apparel and in a pub in Kentish Town, Muller began publicly performing. Muller asked a friend who knew how to use Logic to produce a few demos in exchange for a bottle of wine. She uploaded them to SoundCloud in 2017, and after sharing a video of her singing onto Instagram, Muller was discovered and signed by her manager. Her debut extended play, After Hours, was released in February 2018, and After Hours was followed by the release of her second EP, Frankly, in September 2018. Muller signed to Capitol Records UK in the same year. 

On 5 April 2019, Muller released her debut studio album, Chapter 1. She then supported Little Mix on their 2019 LM5: The Tour. Following the tour, she released a single titled "Therapist", which she had performed on the tour. Alongside the release of "Therapist", Muller also announced her first national tour, visiting five cities across the United Kingdom. In September 2020, she announced that her third EP would be released on 6 November 2020. The EP, titled No One Else, Not Even You, was supported by a headline tour across the United Kingdom and Europe.

In 2021, Muller appeared as guest vocalist on "When You're Out" with Billen Ted. She then joined the Swedish artist collective Neiked and the American rapper Polo G on the single "Better Days", a song which was a new entry at number 57 on the Billboard Hot 100 chart of 30 October, later peaking at number 23. "Better Days" scored a Top 10 US Pop Airplay and also charted on the UK Singles Chart, reaching a peak position of number 32.

On 3 March 2023, Muller released a single in collaboration with Sigala, Caity Baser and Stefflon Don, titled "Feels This Good". On 9 March 2023, Muller was announced as the UK's entry for the Eurovision Song Contest 2023 in Liverpool. Her entry, "I Wrote a Song", was released on the same day, accompanied by a music video.

Artistry 
Muller lists Gwen Stefani, Lily Allen, and Florence and the Machine, amongst her musical influences. She grew up listening to her mother's favourite artists, including The Chicks, and sixties touchstone Simon & Garfunkel. Muller described hearing Lily Allen' debut album, Alright, Still, as a pivotal moment for her.

Discography

Studio albums

Extended plays

Singles

References

External links
 

1997 births
21st-century British women singers
21st-century English people
21st-century English women
British contemporary R&B singers
Capitol Records artists
English women singer-songwriters
English women pop singers
Eurovision Song Contest entrants for the United Kingdom
Eurovision Song Contest entrants of 2023
Feminist musicians
Living people
People from Kentish Town
Singers from London
Jewish English musicians
English Jews
English people of German-Jewish descent